Jeffrey Shaw is a new media artist and researcher

Jeffrey Shaw may also refer to:
Jeff Shaw (born 1966), baseball player
Jeff Shaw (politician) (1949–2010), Australian lawyer, judge, and former Attorney General of New South Wales

See also
Geoffrey Shaw (disambiguation)
 Percy Shaw Jeffrey, English schoolmaster